Back to Home (Also Called - Welcome To Moon Village) is a 2019 Taiwanese television series created and produced by SETTV. It stars Hsieh Kunda, Cosmos Lin, Wu Nien-hsuan, Li Jia-yu and Yang Kuei-mei as the main cast. Filming began on 20 January 2019 and ended on 11 July 2019. It was first broadcast on 5 May 2019 on TTV and airs every Sunday night from 10 pm to 11.30 pm.

Cast

Main cast
Hsieh Kunda as Bi Guo-jian 畢國建
Ruan Bai-hao as child Guo-jian
Cosmos Lin as Nan Yue-li 南月禮
Song Ting-yi as child Yue-li
Yang Kuei-mei as Zhou Hui-min 周慧敏
Wu Nien-hsuan as Ma Wei-hai 馬威海
Li Jia-yu s Xia Ou 夏鷗
Akio Chen as Xia Shou-fu 夏守富
Judy Liu as 4th sister Ma 馬四姐
Alice Huang as Xu Feng-yin 徐鳳音

Supporting cast
Cheng Ping-Chun as Bi Yong-wang 畢永望
Liu Han-qiang as Uncle Wu 午叔
Wu Xin-yun as Ma Yu-shan 馬玉姍
Liao Wei-bo as Xia Zhi 夏志
Yu Cheng-hsin as Ah Jiong 阿冏
Chris Chen as Kang You-di 康又迪
Chen Yu-xiang as young You-di
Wu Chia-Shan as Grandma Kang 康奶奶
Kuo Tzu-chien as Guo Fu-cheng 郭富城
Angel Hong as Zhuo Zi-mei 卓子玫
Jack Lee as Mai Qing-zhe 麥青哲
Ray Fan as Lu Yan-qin 呂燕琴

Guest actors
Michael Tao as Director Tang 唐董
Josh Lin as Master Da Long 大隆師傅
Jason Chan as Guo-jian's assistant
Leo Lee as Allen (Yue-li's ex-boyfriend)
Claire Yen as Amy (Allen's fiancé)
Eunice Han as Ah Ru 阿如
Chiu Yi-Feng as manager
Mu Qi as shop assistant
Joyce Godenzi as Hui-min's friend
Yen Yung Lie as Mr. Wu 吳先生
Crowd Lu as Guo Xue-fu 郭學福 (Fu-cheng's son)

Soundtrack
Self-complacement 愛情怎麼了嗎 by Crowd Lu
Vulnerability 如果我沒有傷口 by Jolin Tsai
Song of Summer 夏天的歌 by Crowd Lu
Imperfect Rainbow 殘缺的彩虹 by Cheer Chen
Bromance 華生 by Cheer Chen
Perfect Time 下次見 by Vast & Hazy
Happiness Awaits 預告幸福 by Alina Cheng
You Make the Sun Shine 陽光燦爛的原因 by Alina Cheng

Broadcast

Ratings

References

External links
 
Official Website on SETTV 
 
 

2019 Taiwanese television series debuts
2019 Taiwanese television series endings
Taiwanese romance television series
Taiwanese drama television series
Taiwan Television original programming
Sanlih E-Television original programming